The Great Synagogue is a synagogue at 45-47 Leselidze Street in Tbilisi in the republic of Georgia.

History
The building, also known as the Georgian Synagogue, was built from 1895 to 1903 in an eclectic style by Georgian Jews from Akhaltsikhe who migrated to Tbilisi in the late 19th century, thus the synagogue is also called the “synagogue of the people of Akhaltsikhe”. 

There is also a synagogue in Tbilisi built by the Jews of Tshinvali at 13 Kozhevennyi Tupik Street.

External links
 The Georgian Synagogue in Tbilisi, Georgia | The Museum of the Jewish People at Beit Hatfutsot

Orthodox synagogues
Religious buildings and structures in Tbilisi
Synagogues in Georgia (country)
Synagogue buildings with domes
Synagogues completed in 1903